Carolina THC  is a handball club from Chapel Hill, North Carolina, United States. They are the handball team of the University of North Carolina at Chapel Hill. They play with three teams at various competitions. The first team called Carolina THC is the University team, the Tar Heels THC is a novice team and Carolina Blue is the alumni team.

Victories
3 times winner of the men College Nationals 2004-2006
4 times winner of the women College Nationals 2004, 2009-2011
Winner of the men Southeast Team Handball Conference 2000
Winner of the women Southeast Team Handball Conference 2004

Carolina Blue Cup
The Carolina THC is the host of the annual Carolina Blue Cup. They have won it twice, in 2007 and 2020.

Rankings

2005-06

2017-18

* No Ranking was released.

Non of the women's team received votes for the women's poll.

2018-19

References

External links

Handball clubs established in 1989
1989 establishments in North Carolina